The 2002–03 NBA season was the 57th season of the National Basketball Association (NBA). The season ended with the San Antonio Spurs beating the New Jersey Nets 4–2 in the 2003 NBA Finals. This would be Michael Jordan's last season in the NBA. This season would also mark the first finals since the 1998–99 NBA season that the Lakers did not appear in, and the Spurs' first finals appearance since then.

Notable occurrences

The Hornets relocate from Charlotte, North Carolina to New Orleans, Louisiana.
At halftime of the Hornets' first game in New Orleans, the team retired Pete Maravich's jersey number against their former tenants, the Utah Jazz. Though Maravich never played for the Hornets, he had been a star player with LSU Tigers and New Orleans Jazz.
The San Antonio Spurs played their first game at the SBC Center, (now the AT&T Center).
The Houston Rockets played their final season at the Compaq Center (formerly as The Summit).
The 2003 NBA All-Star Game was held at the Philips Arena in Atlanta. The West won 155–145 in double-overtime, the longest All-Star game in NBA history. Minnesota's Kevin Garnett took the game's MVP honors. It was also the last time an Eastern Conference city hosted an All-Star Game (until 2012), and the last time a rookie played (until 2011) and started an All-Star game, with Yao Ming making his All-Star debut.
Michael Jordan announces his third and final retirement. He plays his last game on April 16, 2003 in Philadelphia.
The NBA on ABC begins (replacing NBA on NBC) again after a 29-year hiatus when the NBA signs new television deals with TNT and the consortium of ABC and ESPN. This agreement significantly decreased the number of games on network television, including the playoffs, in which very few games are shown on ABC, with the exception of the NBA Finals, which are shown entirely on ABC. Also, both conference finals are shown live on cable for the first time.
For the first time in NBA history, two former ABA teams contest each other in the NBA Finals, the New Jersey Nets versus the San Antonio Spurs. 
The NBA changes the first-round format from a best-of-five-game series to a best-of-seven-game series for the 2003 NBA playoffs.
A new low in television ratings for the NBA Finals is reached, replacing the 1981 series as the least-watched Finals (later surpassed by the 2007 Finals).
On January 7, Kobe Bryant of the Los Angeles Lakers scored 45 points against the Seattle SuperSonics. Kobe made nine consecutive three-pointers and finished with 12 overall, a new NBA record for most threes in a game, later tied by Donyell Marshall and broken by Stephen Curry (with 13 threes) and Zach LaVine and later fellow Splash Brother, Klay Thompson (with 14 threes).
 The Los Angeles Lakers debuted their white and gold alternate home jerseys in a loss against the Sacramento Kings on Christmas Day, December 25, 2002, at Staples Center. The jerseys were designed as a tribute to long-time announcer Chick Hearn, who died on August 5 from a head injury caused by a fall. The Lakers also sport a black patch in his honor. 
Lenny Wilkens becomes the all-time leader in losses, surpassing the late Bill Fitch.
Reebok became the official outfitter for the NBA. Although fellow outfitter Nike still under their contracts. Reebok remained as the outfitter of the NBA until they merged with Adidas became the official outfitter in 2006.
David Robinson announced his retirement. He would eventually go on to win the championship with the Spurs.
 The elimination of Utah Jazz in the first round of the playoffs marks the end of the 18-year Karl Malone–John Stockton tandem. Stockton would go on to retire, while Malone would play with the Lakers next season before retiring in 2004.
 The NBA has mandated installation of LED light strips on both the backboard and the scorer's table that illuminate when time expires, to assist with any potential review.
 The Dallas Mavericks started the season 14–0 one shy to tied the best start of the season set by the 1948–49 Washington Capitols and the 1993–94 Houston Rockets they started the season 15–0. The record was broken by the 2015–16 Golden State Warriors they started the season 24–0 during the 28–game winning–streak they won the last four games in the 2014–15 season.
 The Spurs and the Mavericks tied for the best record at 60–22. The Spurs won a tie–breaker for the best record due to better Conference records.
 The NBA introduces the Hardwood Classic nights for team and player milestones, team anniversary, and championship team anniversary which included the (Philadelphia 76ers, New Jersey Nets, Seattle SuperSonics, Washington Wizards, and other teams). In Game 5 of the 2003 Finals series, the Nets wore a throwback jersey from the 1976 team marked the only time in NBA Finals history wear a throwback jersey.

2002–03 NBA changes
Golden State Warriors – slightly changed their uniforms added orange on the side panels to their jerseys and shorts.
Los Angeles Clippers – added new blue road alternate uniforms with white side panels to their jerseys and shorts.
Los Angeles Lakers – added new white home alternate uniforms with gold side panels to their jerseys and shorts played on Sunday nights and Christmas Day games only.
Portland Trail Blazers – added new logo and new uniforms, slightly changed their uniforms and also added new red road alternate uniforms.
New Orleans Hornets – relocation from Charlotte, North Carolina to New Orleans, Louisiana, added new logo and new uniforms, adding yellow to their color scheme of teal, purple, and dark navy blue.
New York Knicks – slightly changed their uniforms, added "NYK" subway token on the alternate logo on the back of their jersey.
Sacramento Kings – changed their uniforms added side panels to their jerseys and shorts while the road jersey changed from black to purple with black side panels and "Sacramento" script wordmark on their jersey and white home jerseys with purple side panels and "Kings" script wordmark on their jersey.
San Antonio Spurs – added new logo and new uniforms, replacing the fiesta colors of turquoise, fuschia and orange with black, and silver to their color scheme, slightly changed their uniforms, and moved into their new arena the SBC Center, (now as AT&T Center).

Standings

By division

Eastern Conference

Western Conference

By conference

Notes
z – Clinched home court advantage for the entire playoffs
c – Clinched home court advantage for the conference playoffs
y – Clinched division title 
x – Clinched playoff spot

Playoffs
Teams in bold advanced to the next round. The numbers to the left of each team indicate the team's seeding in its conference, and the numbers to the right indicate the number of games the team won in that round. The division champions are marked by an asterisk. Home-court advantage does not necessarily belong to the higher-seeded team, but instead the team with the better regular-season record; teams enjoying the home advantage are shown in italics.

Statistics leaders

Awards

Yearly awards
Most Valuable Player: Tim Duncan, San Antonio Spurs
Rookie of the Year: Amar'e Stoudemire, Phoenix Suns
Defensive Player of the Year: Ben Wallace, Detroit Pistons
Sixth Man of the Year: Bobby Jackson, Sacramento Kings
Most Improved Player: Gilbert Arenas, Golden State Warriors
Coach of the Year: Gregg Popovich, San Antonio Spurs
Executive of the Year: Joe Dumars, Detroit Pistons
Sportsmanship Award: Ray Allen, Seattle SuperSonics

All-NBA First Team:
F – Kevin Garnett, Minnesota Timberwolves
F – Tim Duncan, San Antonio Spurs
C – Shaquille O'Neal, Los Angeles Lakers
G – Kobe Bryant, Los Angeles Lakers
G – Tracy McGrady, Orlando Magic

All-NBA Second Team:
F – Dirk Nowitzki, Dallas Mavericks
F – Chris Webber, Sacramento Kings
C – Ben Wallace, Detroit Pistons
G – Jason Kidd, New Jersey Nets
G – Allen Iverson, Philadelphia 76ers

All-NBA Third Team:
F – Paul Pierce, Boston Celtics
F – Jamal Mashburn, New Orleans Hornets
C – Jermaine O'Neal, Indiana Pacers
G – Stephon Marbury, Phoenix Suns
G – Steve Nash, Dallas Mavericks

NBA All-Defensive First Team
F – Tim Duncan, San Antonio Spurs
F – Kevin Garnett, Minnesota Timberwolves
C – Ben Wallace, Detroit Pistons
G – Doug Christie, Sacramento Kings
G – Kobe Bryant, Los Angeles Lakers

All-Defensive Second Team:
F – Ron Artest, Indiana Pacers
F – Bruce Bowen, San Antonio Spurs
C – Shaquille O'Neal, Los Angeles Lakers
G – Jason Kidd, New Jersey Nets
G – Eric Snow, Philadelphia 76ers

NBA All-Rookie First Team:
Yao Ming, Houston Rockets
Amar'e Stoudemire, Phoenix Suns
Caron Butler, Miami Heat
Drew Gooden, Orlando Magic
Nenê Hilario, Denver Nuggets

All-Rookie Second Team:
G – Manu Ginóbili, San Antonio Spurs
G – Gordan Giricek, Orlando Magic
F – Carlos Boozer, Cleveland Cavaliers
G – Jay Williams, Chicago Bulls
G – J. R. Bremer, Boston Celtics

Players of the month
The following players were named the Eastern and Western Conference Players of the Month.

Rookies of the month
The following players were named the Eastern and Western Conference Rookies of the Month.

Coaches of the month
The following coaches were named the Eastern and Western Conference Coaches of the Month.

Notes

References

 
NBA
2002–03 in Canadian basketball